The World Cyber Games 2005 was held in Singapore at Suntec Singapore International Convention and Exhibition Centre from 16 to 20 November 2005. There were over 800 players from 67 countries. Over 39,000 spectators turned up at the games to cheer for the players. The grand prize for the game is US$435,000.

Games played at WCG 2005
Official games

PC games
Counter-Strike: Source
FIFA Football 2005
Need For Speed: Underground 2
StarCraft: Brood War
Warcraft III: The Frozen Throne
Warhammer 40,000: Dawn of War

Xbox games
Dead or Alive Ultimate
Halo 2

Special tournament game
 freestyle

Mobile tournament games
Bruce Lee
 Chopper Rescue
 Goolie
Midtown Madness 3

Promotional event game
 Carom 3D

Awards and medals

Players' village
The Costa Sands Resort (Downtown East) in Singapore served as the WCG 2005 Players' Village.
About 800 national representatives who advanced from the WCG 2005 national championships stayed at the Players' Village during the WCG 2005 Grand Final.

Sponsors
Worldwide sponsor
Samsung Electronics

Premier sponsors
Intel
Razer USA Ltd

Official sponsors
Singapore Telecommunications
Video Pro

Official suppliers
ProCurve
Kingston Technology
Ablerex
Seagate
ASUS
Foxconn
Cooler Master
VRnet
DVDrama
Radioitg

Host broadcaster
MediaCorp

Official media partners
Gameaxis
HardwareZone
Hardware Magazine
PHOTO-i
PC Magazine

Official gaming magazine
Gameaxis
Playworks

Official partners
Blizzard Entertainment
EA Sports
EA Games
Microsoft
Tecmo
THQ
Valve
Xbox Live

Commentators
Online audio and video coverage was provided by Inside the Game.

Marcus Graham (djWHEAT)

Games covered: Counter-Strike: Source, Dead or Alive Ultimate, Halo 2

Stuart Saw (TosspoT)

Games covered: Counter-Strike: Source, Warcraft III: The Frozen Throne, FIFA Football 2005

Paul Chaloner (ReDeYe)

Games covered: Counter-Strike: Source, Need For Speed: Underground 2, FIFA Football 2005

Jason Hutchison (NiceGuyEd)

Games covered: Counter-Strike: Source, FIFA Football 2005, Need For Speed: Underground 2, Dead or Alive Ultimate, Halo 2

Christopher Iannitti (WaCKSteVeN)

Games covered: StarCraft: Brood War, Warcraft III: The Frozen Throne

Nicolas Plott (Tasteless)

Games covered: StarCraft: Brood War, Warhammer 40,000: Dawn of War

Kim Phan (bunny)

Games covered: StarCraft: Brood War, Warcraft III: The Frozen Throne

Results

Official

Special

Mobile

Promotional

Results by table

Notable participant
Verena Vlajo (Austria), the first female participant

References

External links
World Cyber Games Official Website

World Cyber Games events
2005 in Singaporean sport
2005 in esports
Esports competitions in Singapore
November 2005 sports events in Asia